Nemesis (minor planet designation: 128 Nemesis) is a large 180 km main-belt asteroid, of carbonaceous composition. It rotates rather slowly, taking about 78 hours to complete one rotation. Nemesis is the largest member of the Nemesian asteroid family bearing its name. It was discovered by J. C. Watson on 25 November 1872, and named after Nemesis, the goddess of retribution in Greek mythology.

The orbital plane is inclined by 6.2° to the plane of the ecliptic. It is categorized as a C-type asteroid, indicating a primitive carbonaceous composition. Based on IRAS data Nemesis is about 188 km in diameter and is around the 33rd largest main-belt asteroid, while WISE measurements yield a size of ~163 km. The 77.81‑hour rotation period is the second longest for an asteroid more than 150 km in diameter.

Between 2005 and 2021, 128 Nemesis has been observed to occult eight stars.

References

External links 
 
 
  

000128
Discoveries by James Craig Watson
Named minor planets
000128
000128
18721125